The men's 1500 metres event at the 2020 Summer Olympics took place between 3 and 7 August 2021 at the Japan National Stadium. Approximately fifty athletes were expected to compete; the exact number depended on how many nations used universality places to enter athletes in addition to the 45 qualifying through time or ranking (1 universality place was used in 2016). 47 competitors from 27 nations competed. Jakob Ingebrigtsen set a new Olympic record on his way to the gold medal, Norway's first medal in the men's 1500 metres. Timothy Cheruiyot of Kenya took silver, returning that nation to the podium for the first time since a four-Games medal streak ended in 2008. Josh Kerr earned bronze, Great Britain's first medal in the event since 1988.

Summary

Since 2018, Timothy Cheruiyot has been on top of the world leader board. A step behind him, both in the leader board and in major races was the name Ingebrigtsen, first Filip Ingebrigtsen in 2018, then replaced by his younger brother Jakob Ingebrigtsen still more than a month shy of his 21st birthday at these Olympics. Cheruiyot won the 2019 World Championships by breaking away to a 2 second victory in an exceptionally fast race. 2019 was in sharp contrast to the slow, strategic race in Rio, won by Matthew Centrowitz more than 20 seconds slower. Centrowitz was back to defend his title, but was eliminated in the semi final round along with defending bronze medalist Nick Willis and World Championship bronze medalist Marcin Lewandowski. Olympic silver medalist Taoufik Makhloufi was injured before he could race in Tokyo.

After the runners sorted themselves out at the start of the final, Jakob, the only Ingebrigtsen in the race, moved around the pack to take the lead and press the pace. Cheruiyot moved himself up from mid pack to mark Ingebrigtsen.  The first lap was completed in 56.2. Then Cheruiyot moved to the front to press the pace further. The race was in a single file line, Stewart McSweyn and Ollie Hoare next in line, Abel Kipsang on the outside trying to get past the two Australians. Second lap 1:51.8, a 55.6 by Cheruiyot. Hoare began moving backward, Jake Wightman came forward to race Kipsang. A gap formed between the lead group of Cheruiyot, Ingebrigtsen and McSweyn, with Kipsang leading the line of chasers. Through the penultimate turn, McSweyn couldn't keep up and the leaders were two. Lap 3 2:47.3, a 55.5. Ingebrigtsen glued to the back of Cheruiyot. Josh Kerr chasing Kipsang for bronze. Through the final turn, Ingebrigtsen moved up on Cheruiyot, then past. Cheruiyot looked back to see who else was going to try to pass him, an obvious sign he had nothing more to offer to chase Ingebrigtsen.  Ingebrigtsen opened up a four metre gap before crossing the finish line. Kerr got past Kipsang and chased Cheruiyot to the finish, leaning at the line still didn't quite snatch silver. 

Ingebrigtsen's 3:28.32 new Olympic record beat the record set by Kipsang in the semi finals of 3:31.65, as well as Noah Ngeny's Olympic record from 2000 by 3.75 seconds. Ngeny's final lap, 55.4.

In a much publicized act of sportsmanship Cheruiyot gave a bracelet to Ingebrigtsen along with a congratulatory embrace; Cheruiyot had previously defeated Ingebrigtsen in 10 of their previous meetings over 1500m.

Background
This was the 29th appearance of the event, which is one of 12 athletics events to have been held at every Summer Olympics.

For the first time in Olympic history, no nations made their men's 1500 metres debut this Games. The United States made its 28th appearance, most of all nations (having missed only the boycotted 1980 Games).

Qualification

A National Olympic Committee (NOC) could enter up to 3 qualified athletes in the men's 1500 metres event if all athletes meet the entry standard or qualify by ranking during the qualifying period. (The limit of 3 has been in place since the 1930 Olympic Congress.) The qualifying standard is 3:35.00. This standard was "set for the sole purpose of qualifying athletes with exceptional performances unable to qualify through the IAAF World Rankings pathway." The world rankings, based on the average of the best five results for the athlete over the qualifying period and weighted by the importance of the meet, will then be used to qualify athletes until the cap of 45 is reached.

The qualifying period was originally from 1 May 2019 to 29 June 2020. Due to the COVID-19 pandemic, the period was suspended from 6 April 2020 to 30 November 2020, with the end date extended to 29 June 2021. The world rankings period start date was also changed from 1 May 2019 to 30 June 2020; athletes who had met the qualifying standard during that time were still qualified, but those using world rankings would not be able to count performances during that time. The qualifying time standards could be obtained in various meets during the given period that have the approval of the IAAF. Both indoor and outdoor meets are eligible. The most recent Area Championships may be counted in the ranking, even if not during the qualifying period.

NOCs can also use their universality place—each NOC can enter one male athlete regardless of time if they had no male athletes meeting the entry standard for an athletics event—in the 1500 metres.

Entry number: 45.

Competition format
The event continued to use the three-round format used previously in 1952 and since 1964. There were 3 heats, with the top 6 in each heat and next 6 overall advancing to the semifinals (an additional 2 athletes advanced by ruling after being obstructed). There were 2 semifinals, with the top 5 in each semifinal and next 2 overall advancing (another obstruction ruling provided a 13th qualifier for the final).

Records
Prior to this competition, the existing world, Olympic, and area records were as follows.

The following records were established during the competition:

Schedule
All times are Japan Standard Time (UTC+9)

The men's 1500 metres took place over three separate days.

Results

Heats
Qualification Rules: First 6 in each heat (Q) and the next 6 fastest (q) advance to the Semifinals

Heat 1

Heat 2
Marcin Lewandowski was pushed and fell, but got up again and finished his heat in last place. On appeal, he progressed to the semi final. Original 8th place finisher Sadik Mikhou was later disqualified on the 8th of August for blood doping after an out of competition test produced an abnormal result.

Heat 3

Semifinals
Qualification Rules: First 5 in each heat (Q) and the next 2 fastest (q) advance to the Final 

Source:

Semifinal 1

Semifinal 2

Final

References

Men's 1500 metres
2020
Men's events at the 2020 Summer Olympics